The Vijay for Best Choreographer is given by STAR Vijay as part of its annual Vijay Awards ceremony for Tamil  (Kollywood) films.

The list
Here is a list of the award winners and the films for which they won.

Nominations 
 2007 Dinesh - "Vasantha Mullai" (Pokkiri)
Ajay Raaj - "Jalsa" (Chennai 600028)
Brindha -  "Unakkul Naane" (Pachaikili Muthucharam)
Lawrence Raghavendra - "Athiradee" (Sivaji)
Raju Sundaram - "June Ponal" (Unnale Unnale)
 2008 Dhina - "Kaththala Kannaley" (Anjathey)
Brindha - "Anjalai" (Vaaranam Aayiram)
Robert - "Nalamthaana" (Silambattam)
Shobi Paulraj - "Taxi Taxi" (Sakkarakatti)
2009 Shobi Paulraj - "Aathi Chudi" (TN 07 AL 4777)
Baba Bhaskar - "Daddy Mummy" (Villu)
Dinesh - "Pala Pala" (Ayan)
Saravana Rajan - "Allegra" (Kanthaswamy)
Shobi Paulraj - "Damakku"(Aadhavan)
2010 Dinesh - "Jilla Veettu" (Easan) 
Remo Fernandez - "Irumbile Oru Irudhaiyam" (Enthiran)
Kandaas - "Un Per Solla" (Angadi Theru)
Raju Sundaram - "Kilimanjaro" (Enthiran)
Flexy Stu - "Hosanna" (Vinnaithaandi Varuvaayaa)
2011 K. Suchitra - "Dia Dia Dole" (Avan Ivan)
 Dhina- "Maasama" (Engeyum Eppodhum)
 Dinesh - "Otha Sollala" (Aadukalam)
Kalyan - "Kaadhal Yen Kaadhal" (Mayakkam Enna)
 Raju Sundaram - "Nangaai" (Engeyum Kadhal)
2012 Robert - "Love Panlama Venama" (Podaa Podi)
Dinesh  - "Venaam Machan" (Oru Kal Oru Kannadi)
Farah Khan - "Irukkana" (Nanban)
Shobi Paulraj - "Antarctica" (Thuppakki)
Sridhar - "Alaikka Laikka" (Thuppakki)
 2013 Brinda - "Adiyae" (Kadal)
 Baba Bhaskar - "Local Boys" (Ethir Neechal)
 Pandit Birju Maharaj - "Unnai Kaanadhu Naan" (Vishwaroopam)
 Sherif (choreographer) - "Kasu Panam" (Soodhu Kavvum)
 Sridhar - "Tamizh Pasanga" (Thalaiva)
 2014 Shobi Paulraj - "Oruthi Mela" (Jeeva)
 Baba Bhaskar - "What a Karavaad" (Velaiyilla Pattathari)
Brinda - "Darling Dambakku" (Maan Karate)
Raju Sundaram - "Sandi Kuthirai" (Kaaviya Thalaivan)
Sathish Krishnan - "Kaagidha Kappal" (Madras)

See also
 Tamil cinema
 Cinema of India

References

Choreographer